Gina Rae Mosbrucker, previously known as Gina McCabe, (born 1963) is an American politician who has served as a member of the Washington House of Representatives since January 1, 2015, when she was sworn in 11 days ahead of most new Washington state legislators. She was elected in 2014 to succeed retiring Republican Charles Ross.

Early life
Born Gina Mosbrucker, she is a fourth-generation resident of Klickitat County, Washington.

Career 
Mosbrucker runs the Goldendale Quality Inn and Suites Hotel and a performing arts studio in her hometown of Goldendale. She is a former vice president and director of the Goldendale Chamber of Commerce. For sixteen years, she went by her husband's surname "McCabe", but after divorcing her husband in April 2018, reverted her surname to "Mosbrucker".

Awards 
 2021 City Champion Awards. Presented by Association of Washington Cities (AWC).

References

1963 births
Living people
People from Goldendale, Washington
American hoteliers
University of Washington alumni
Republican Party members of the Washington House of Representatives
Women state legislators in Washington (state)
21st-century American politicians
21st-century American women politicians
Clark College alumni